This is a list of notable television festivals.

Television festivals

 &actioninternational media festival Norway
 ATX Television Festival USA
  Banff World Media Festival Canada
  BRITDOC Foundation UK
  Celtic Media Festival 
  Edinburgh International Television Festival UK
  Festival International de Programmes Audiovisuels France
  FesTVal  Spain
  ITVFest (Independent Television Festival) 
  Monte-Carlo Television Festival Monaco
  New York Television Festival  USA
North Fork TV Festival USA
  Panafrican Film and Television Festival of Ouagadougou Burkina Faso
  Serial Killer Czech Republic
  Seriencamp Germany
  Venice TV Awards Venice
  VerCiência Brazil

See also
 Film festival
 List of FESPACO award winners
 List of festivals
 Lists of festivals – festival list articles on Wikipedia

References

 
Television